The 45th Annual Grammy Awards were held on February 23, 2003 at Madison Square Garden in New York City honoring the best in music for the recording of the year beginning from October 1, 2001 through September 30, 2002. Musicians accomplishments from the previous year were recognized. Norah Jones and her song "Don't Know Why" were the main recipients of the night, garnering six Grammys, including four major awards: Record of the Year, Album of the Year, Song of the Year and Best New Artist, plus Best Female Pop Vocal Performance and Best Pop Vocal Album. Songwriter Jesse Harris received the Song of the Year award for his work on "Don't Know Why." Simon and Garfunkel reunited to open the show performing "The Sound of Silence".

The Bee Gees were presented with the "Legend Award", only 42 days after the sudden death of Maurice Gibb. The award was received by the surviving brothers, Barry and  Robin. During Barry's speech, he made mention of Maurice's widow Yvonne and their children Adam and Sami, and in a heartfelt, gracious and tearful moment announced that he and Robin were presenting the award to Maurice. It was then accepted by Adam, at Barry's request, on behalf of his late father, his mother and his sister.

Performers
 Bruce Springsteen & The E Street Band - The Rising
 No Doubt - Underneath It All/Hella Good
 Eminem - Lose Yourself
 Faith Hill - Cry
 Dixie Chicks - Landslide
 Nelly & Kelly Rowland - Hot In Herre/Dilemma
 Ashanti - Dreams
 N'Sync - Tribute to Bee Gees
 James Taylor 
 Sheryl Crow & Kid Rock
 John Mayer - Your Body Is A Wonderland
 Vanessa Carlton - A Thousand Miles
 Norah Jones - Don't Know Why
 Avril Lavigne - Sk8er Boi
 Elvis Costello, Dave Grohl, Tony Kanal, Little Steven, Bruce Springsteen, Pete Thomas - London Calling (tribute to Joe Strummer)

Presenters
 Lou Reed & Dave Grohl - Best Pop Performance by a Duo or Group with Vocals
 Kylie Minogue & Justin Timberlake - Best Pop Vocal Album
 Herbie Hancock, Martina McBride & Raphael Saadiq - Best Country Album
 Kim Cattrall & P. Diddy - Best Male Pop Vocal Performance & Best Rap Album
 Harvey Fierstein & Rod Stewart - Best Comedy Album
 Eve & Fred Durst - Best Hard Rock Performance
 Alicia Keys & Cyndi Lauper - Best New Artist 
 Pat Monahan, Erykah Badu & B.B. King - Song of the Year
 Bonnie Raitt & Aretha Franklin - Record of the Year
 Elvis Costello, Michelle Branch & Peter Gabriel - Album of the Year

Award winners

General
Record of the Year
 "Don't Know Why" – Norah Jones
 Norah Jones, Arif Mardin & Jay Newland, producers; Arif Mardin & Jay Newland, engineers/mixers
 "A Thousand Miles" – Vanessa Carlton
 Ron Fair, producer; Tal Herzberg, Jack Joseph Puig & Michael C. Ross, engineers/mixers
 "Without Me" – Eminem
 Jeff Bass & Eminem, producers; Steve King, engineer/mixer
 "Dilemma" – Nelly & Kelly Rowland
 Bam & Ryan Bowser, producers; Brian Garten, engineer/mixer
 "How You Remind Me" – Nickelback
 Nickelback & Rick Parashar, producers; Joey Moi & Randy Staub, engineers/mixers

Album of the Year
 Come Away With Me – Norah Jones Norah Jones, Arif Mardin, Jay Newland & Craig Street, producers; Husky Huskolds, Arif Mardin & Jay Newland, engineers/mixers; Ted Jensen, mastering engineer Home – Dixie Chicks
 Dixie Chicks & Lloyd Maines, producers; Gary Paczosa, engineer/mixer; Robert Hadley & Doug Sax, mastering engineers
 The Eminem Show – Eminem
 Jeff Bass, Dr. Dre, Eminem & Denaun Porter, producers; Steve Baughman, Mauricio "Veto" Iragorri & Steve King, engineers/mixers; Brian "Big Bass" Gardner, mastering engineer
 Nellyville – Nelly
 Jason "Jay E" Epperson, Just Blaze, The Neptunes, The Trackboyz & Waiel "Wally" Yaghnam, producers; Steve Eigner, Brian Garten, Russ Giraud, Gimel "Young Guru" Keaton, Greg Morgenstein, Matt Still & Rich Travali, engineers/mixers; Herb Powers, mastering engineer
 The Rising – Bruce Springsteen
 Brendan O'Brien, producer; Nick DiDia & Brendan O'Brien, engineers/mixers; Bob Ludwig, mastering engineer

Song of the Year
 "Don't Know Why" Jesse Harris, songwriter (Norah Jones) "Complicated" 
 Avril Lavigne, & The Matrix, songwriters (Avril Lavigne)
 "The Rising" 
 Bruce Springsteen, songwriter (Bruce Springsteen)
 "A Thousand Miles" 
 Vanessa Carlton, songwriter, (Vanessa Carlton)
 "Where Were You (When the World Stopped Turning)" 
 Alan Jackson, songwriter (Alan Jackson)

Best New ArtistNorah JonesAshanti
Michelle Branch
Avril Lavigne
John Mayer

Pop
Best Female Pop Vocal Performance
 "Don't Know Why" – Norah Jones "Soak Up the Sun" – Sheryl Crow
 "Complicated" – Avril Lavigne
 "Get the Party Started" – Pink
 "Overprotected" – Britney Spears

Best Male Pop Vocal Performance
 "Your Body Is a Wonderland" – John Mayer "7 Days" – Craig David
 "Original Sin" – Elton John
 "Fragile (Live)" – Sting
 "October Road" – James Taylor

Best Pop Performance by a Duo or Group with Vocal
 "Hey Baby" – No Doubt "Everyday" – Bon Jovi
 "Girl All the Bad Guys Want" – Bowling for Soup
 "Where Are You Going" – Dave Matthews Band
 "Girlfriend" – *NSYNC

Best Pop Collaboration with VocalsSantana & Michelle Branch for "The Game of Love" Christina Aguilera and Redman – "Dirrty"
 India.Arie and Stevie Wonder – "The Christmas Song"
 Tony Bennett and k.d. lang – "What a Wonderful World"
 Sheryl Crow and Don Henley – "It's So Easy"
 Natalie Cole and Diana Krall – "Better Than Anything"

Best Pop Instrumental Performance
B.B. King for "Auld Lang Syne"

Best Pop Vocal AlbumNorah Jones - Come Away with Me
Avril Lavigne - Let Go
Pink - Missundaztood
Britney Spears - Britney
No Doubt - Rock Steady

Best Pop Instrumental Album
Norman Brown for Just Chillin'

Alternative
 Best Alternative Music Album
 A Rush of Blood to the Head – Coldplay
 Sea Change – Beck
Walking with Thee – Clinic
Cruel Smile – Elvis Costello & The Imposters
Behind the Music – The Soundtrack of Our Lives

Blues
Best Traditional Blues Album
Anthony Daigle, John Holbrock (engineers/mixers) & B. B. King (producer & artist) for A Christmas Celebration of Hope
Best Contemporary Blues Album
Joe Henry (producer), S. Husky Höskulds (engineer/mixer) & Solomon Burke for Don't Give Up on Me

Children's
Best Musical Album for Children
Joseph Miskulin (producer), Dan Rudin, Brent Truitt (engineers/mixers) & Riders in the Sky for Monsters, Inc. Scream Factory Favorites

Best Spoken Word Album for Children
Tom Chapin for There Was an Old Lady Who Swallowed a Fly

Comedy
From 1994 through 2003, see "Best Spoken Comedy Album" under the "Spoken" field, below.

Classical
Best Orchestral Performance
Andreas Neubronner (producer), Peter Laenger (engineer), Michael Tilson Thomas (conductor) & the San Francisco Symphony Orchestra for Mahler: Symphony No. 6
Best Classical Vocal Performance
Erik Smith (producer), Jonathan Stokes, Neil Hutchinson, Tom Lazarus (engineers), Patrick Summers (conductor), Renée Fleming & Coro del Maggio Musicale Fiorentino for Bel Canto (Bellini, Donizetti, Rossini, etc.)
Best Opera Recording
Christoph Classen (producer), Tobias Lehmann, Eberhard Sengpiel (engineers), Daniel Barenboim (conductor), Jane Eaglen, Thomas Hampson, Waltraud Meier, René Pape, the Chor der Deutschen Staatsoper Berlin & the Staatskapelle Berlinfor Wagner: Tannhäuser
Best Choral Performance
Thomas Moore (producer), Michael J. Bishop (engineer), Robert Spano (conductor), Norman Mackenzie (chorus director), Christine Goerke, Brett Polegato & the Atlanta Symphony Orchestra & Chorus  for Vaughan Williams: A Sea Symphony (Sym. No. 1)
Best Instrumental Soloist(s) Performance (with orchestra)
Thomas Frost (producer), Richard King (engineer), Neville Marriner (conductor), Hilary Hahn & the Academy of St. Martin in the Fields for Brahms/Stravinsky: Violin Concertos
Best Instrumental Soloist Performance (without orchestra)
Andreas Neubronner (producer & engineer) & Murray Perahia for Chopin: Études, Op. 10 & Op. 25
Best Small Ensemble Performance (with or without conductor)
Steve Barnett (producer), Preston Smith (engineer), Joseph Jennings (conductor), Chanticleer & the Handel & Haydn Society of Boston for Tavener: Lamentations and Praises
Best Chamber Music Performance
Andrew Keener (producer), Simon Dominic Eadon (engineer) & the Takács Quartet for Beethoven: String Quartets ("Razumovsky" Op. 59, 1-3; "Harp" Op. 74)
Best Classical Contemporary Composition
Steve Barnett (producer), Preston Smith (engineer), John Tavener (composer), Joseph Jennings (conductor), Chanticleer & the Handel & Haydn Society of Boston for Tavener: Lamentations and Praises
Best Classical Album
Thomas Moore (producer), Michael J. Bishop (engineer), Robert Spano (conductor), Norman Mackenzie (chorus director), Christine Goerke, Brett Polegato & the Atlanta Symphony Orchestra & Chorus for Vaughan Williams: A Sea Symphony (Sym. No. 1)
Best Classical Crossover Album
Sid McLauchlan (producer), Richard Lancaster, Ulrich Vette (engineers), André Previn (conductor) & the London Symphony Orchestra for Previn Conducts Korngold (Sea Hawk; Captain Blood, etc.)

Composing and arranging
Best Instrumental Composition
Thomas Newman (composer) for "Six Feet Under Title Theme"

Best Instrumental Arrangement
Thomas Newman (arranger) for "Six Feet Under Title Theme"

Best Instrumental Arrangement Accompanying Vocalist(s)
Dave Grusin (arranger) for "Mean Old Man" performed by James Taylor

Country
Best Female Country Vocal Performance
Faith Hill for "Cry"
Best Male Country Vocal Performance
Johnny Cash for "Give My Love to Rose"
Best Country Performance by a Duo or Group with Vocal
Dixie Chicks for "Long Time Gone"
Best Country Collaboration with Vocals
Willie Nelson & Lee Ann Womack for "Mendocino County Line"
Best Country Instrumental Performance
Dixie Chicks for "Lil' Jack Slade"
Best Country Song
Alan Jackson (songwriter) for "Where Were You (When the World Stopped Turning)"
Best Country Album
Lloyd Maines (producer), Gary Paczosa (engineer/mixer) & the Dixie Chicks (producers & artists) for Home
Best Bluegrass Album
David Castle (engineer/mixer), the Clinch Mountain Boys, Jim Lauderdale (producers & artists) & Ralph Stanley for Lost in the Lonesome Pines

Dance
Best Dance Recording
Dirty Vegas (producers & artists) for "Days Go By"

Film/TV/media
Best Compilation Soundtrack Album for a Motion Picture, Television or Other Visual Media
Allan Slutsky, Harry Weinger (producers), Ted Greenberg (producer & engineer/mixer), Kooster McAllister (engineer/mixer) & The Funk Brothers for Standing in the Shadows of Motown performed by The Funk Brothers & various artists

Best Song Written for a Motion Picture, Television or Other Visual Media
Randy Newman (songwriter) for "If I Didn't Have You" (from Monsters, Inc.) performed by John Goodman & Billy Crystal

Best Score Soundtrack Album for a Motion Picture, Television or Other Visual Media
John J. Kurlander (engineer/mixer) & Howard Shore (producer & composer) for The Lord of the Rings - The Fellowship of the Ring

Folk
Best Traditional Folk Album
Steven Heller (producer), Steven Heller (engineer/mixer), David Holt (producer & artist) & Doc Watson & for Legacy
Best Contemporary Folk Album
Alison Krauss (producer), Gary Paczosa (engineer/mixer) & Nickel Creek for This Side
Best Native American Music Album
Thomas A. Wasinger (producer) & Mary Youngblood (producer & artist) for Beneath the Raven Moon

Gospel
Best Pop/Contemporary Gospel Album
Vance Powell, Jack Joseph Puig (engineers/mixers) & Jars of Clay (producers & artist) for The Eleventh Hour
Best Rock Gospel Album
Monroe Jones (producer), James J Dineen III (engineer/mixer) & Third Day for Come Together
Best Traditional Soul Gospel Album
John Chelew (producer), Jimmy Hoyson (engineer/mixer) & the Blind Boys of Alabama for Higher Ground
Best Contemporary Soul Gospel Album
Glaurys Ariass, Helsa Ariass (producers & engineers/mixers), Chris Puram (engineer/mixer) & Eartha (producer & artist) for Sidebars
Best Southern, Country or Bluegrass Gospel Album
Art Greenhaw (producer & engineer/mixer), Tim Cooper, Chuck Ebert, Art Greenhaw, Adrian Payne, Robb Tripp & Philip W. York (engineers/mixers), The Jordanaires, Larry Ford & The Light Crust Doughboys for We Called Him Mr. Gospel Music: The James Blackwood Tribute Album
Best Gospel Choir or Chorus Album
B.J. Goss (engineer/mixer) & Carol Cymbala (producer & choir director) for Be Glad performed by the Brooklyn Tabernacle Choir

Historical
Best Historical Album
Dean Blackwood (producer), David Glasser, Christopher King & Matt Sandoski (engineers) for Screamin' and Hollerin' the Blues: The Worlds of Charley Patton

Jazz
Best Jazz Instrumental Solo
Herbie Hancock for My Ship
Best Jazz Instrumental Album, Individual or Group
Doug Doctor, Jay Newland, Rob Griffin (engineers/mixers), Jason Olaine (producer), Michael Brecker (producer & artist), Herbie Hancock & Roy Hargrove for Directions in Music: Live at Massey Hall
Best Large Jazz Ensemble Album
James Farber (engineer/mixer), Dave Holland, Louise Holland (producers) & the Dave Holland Big Band for What Goes Around
Best Jazz Vocal Album
Al Schmitt (engineer/mixer), Tommy LiPuma (producer) & Diana Krall for Live in Paris
Best Contemporary Jazz Album
Rob Eaton (engineer/mixer), Lyle Mays, Pat Metheny, Steven Rodby (producers) & the Pat Metheny Group for Speaking of Now
Best Latin Jazz Album
Phil Magnotti (engineer/mixer), Dave Samuels (producer) & the Caribbean Jazz Project for The Gathering

Latin
Best Latin Pop Album
Bob St. John, Eric Schilling, Gustavo Afont, Iker Gastraminsa, Jaime Lagueruela, Jon Fausty (engineers/mixers), Gonzalo Vasquez (engineer/mixer & producer) Luis Ochoa (producer) & Bacilos (producers and artists) for Caraluna
Best Traditional Tropical Latin Album
Catherine Miller (engineer/mixer), Nat Chediak (producer) & the Bebo Valdés Trio for El Arte del Sabor performed by the Bebo Valdés Trio with Israel López "Cachao" & Carlos "Patato" Valdés
Best Mexican/Mexican-American Album
Benny Faccone (engineer/mixer).  Franco Giordani, John Karpowich & Dennis Parker (engineers) & Joan Sebastian (producer & artist) for Lo Dijo El Corazón
Best Latin Rock/Alternative Album
Benny Faccone (engineer/mixer) Alex González, Fher Olvera (producers) & Maná for Revolución de Amor
Best Tejano Album
Gustavo Alphonso Miranda (engineer/mixer), Manuel Herrera Maldonado (producer) & Emilio Navaira for Acuérdate
Best Salsa Album
Jon Fausty, Maria DeJesus (engineers/mixers), Sergio George (producer) & Celia Cruz for La Negra Tiene Tumbao
Best Merengue Album
Manuel Antonio Tejada Tabar, Raphael Peña, Rolando Alejandro (engineers/mixers), Jose Lugo (producer) & Grupo Mania for Latino

Musical show
Best Musical Show Album
Peter Karam (engineer/mixer), Marc Shaiman (producer, composer & lyricist) & Scott Wittman (lyricist) & the original Broadway cast including Marissa Jaret Winokur & Harvey Fierstein, for Hairspray

Music video
Best Short Form Music Video
Greg Tharp (video producer), Joseph Kahn (video director) & Eminem for "Without Me"
Best Long Form Music Video
Don Letts (video director) & The Clash for Westway to the World

New Age
Best New Age Album
Eric Tingstad & Nancy Rumbel for Acoustic Garden

Packaging and notes
Best Recording Package
Kevin Reagan (art director) for Home performed by the Dixie Chicks

Best Boxed or Special Limited Edition Package
Susan Archie (art director) for Screamin' and Hollerin' the Blues: The Worlds of Charley Patton performed by Charley Patton

Best Album Notes
David H. Evans Jr. (notes writer) for Screamin' and Hollerin' the Blues: The Worlds of Charley Patton performed by Charley Patton

Polka
Best Polka Album
Jimmy Sturr for Top of the World

Production and engineering
Best Engineered Album, Non-Classical
Jay Newland & S. Husky Höskulds (engineers) for Come Away with Me performed by Norah Jones
Best Engineered Album, Classical
Michael J. Bishop (engineer), Robert Spano, Norman Mackenzie (conductor), the Atlanta Symphony Orchestra & Chorus for Vaughan Williams: A Sea Symphony (Sym. No. 1)
Best Remixed Recording, Non-Classical
Roger Sanchez (remixer) for "Hella Good (Roger Sanchez Remix Main)" performed by No Doubt
Producer of the Year, Non-Classical
Arif Mardin
Producer of the Year, Classical
Robert Woods

R&B
Best Female R&B Vocal Performance
Mary J. Blige for "He Think I Don't Know"
Best Male R&B Vocal Performance
Usher for "U Don't Have to Call"
Best R&B Performance by a Duo or Group with Vocal
Stevie Wonder & Take 6 for "Love's in Need of Love Today" (Live)
Best Traditional R&B Vocal Performance
Chaka Khan & The Funk Brothers for "What's Going On"
Best Urban/Alternative Performance
India.Arie for "Little Things"
Best R&B Song
Erykah Badu, Madukwu Chinwah, Rashid Lonnie Lynn (Common), Robert Ozuna, James Poyser, Raphael Saadiq & Glen Standridge (songwriters) for "Love of My Life (An Ode to Hip-Hop)" performed by Erykah Badu featuring Common 
 Michael Archer, Bobby Ozuna, Raphael Saadiq, & Glenn Standridge for "Be Here" (Raphael Saadiq featuring D'Angelo)
 Marsha Ambrosius, Darren "Limitless" Henson, Keith "Keshon" Pelzer, & Natalie Stewart for "Floetic" (Floetry)
 Will Baker, Andrew Ramsey, Shannon Sanders, & India Simpson for "Good Man" (India.Arie)
 Remy Shand for "Take a Message" (Remy Shand)
Best R&B Album
Alvin Speights (engineer/mixer), Shannon Sanders (producer) & India.Arie (producer & artist) for Voyage to India
Best Contemporary R&B Album
Brian Springer, Milwaukee Buck aka Buck 3000 (producer/engineers/mixers), 7 Aurelius (engineer/mixer & producer), Irv Gotti (producer) & Ashanti for Ashanti

Rap
Best Female Rap Solo Performance
 "Scream a.k.a. Itchin'" – Missy Elliott
 "Diary..." – Charli Baltimore
 "Satisfaction" – Eve
 "Na Na Be Like" – Foxy Brown
 "Mystery of Iniquity" – Lauryn Hill

Best Male Rap Solo Performance
 "Hot in Herre" – Nelly
 "Without Me" – Eminem
 "Song Cry" – Jay-Z
 "Rollout (My Business)" – Ludacris
 "Bouncin' Back (Bumpin' Me Against the Wall)" – Mystikal

Best Rap Performance by a Duo or Group
 "The Whole World" – OutKast featuring Killer Mike
 "The Essence" – AZ featuring Nas
 "Still Fly" – Big Tymers
 "Pass the Courvoisier, Part II" – Busta Rhymes featuring P. Diddy & Pharrell
 "Oh Boy" – Cam'ron featuring Juelz Santana

Best Rap/Sung Collaboration
 "Dilemma" – Nelly featuring Kelly Rowland
 "What's Luv?" – Fat Joe featuring Ashanti
 "Always on Time" – Ja Rule featuring Ashanti
 "Po' Folks" – Nappy Roots featuring Anthony Hamilton
 "Like I Love You" – Justin Timberlake featuring Clipse

Best Rap Album
 The Eminem Show – Eminem
 Word of Mouf – Ludacris
 Tarantula – Mystikal
 Nellyville – Nelly
 Diary of a Sinner: 1st Entry – Petey Pablo

Reggae
Best Reggae Album
Lee 'Scratch' Perry for Jamaican E.T.

Rock
Best Female Rock Vocal Performance
Sheryl Crow for "Steve McQueen"
Best Male Rock Vocal Performance
Bruce Springsteen for "The Rising"
Best Rock Performance by a Duo or Group with Vocal
Coldplay for "In My Place"
Best Rock Instrumental Performance
The Flaming Lips for "Approaching Pavonis Mons By Balloon (Utopia Planitia)"
Best Hard Rock Performance
Foo Fighters for "All My Life"
Best Metal Performance
Korn for "Here to Stay"
Best Rock Song
Bruce Springsteen (songwriter) for "The Rising"
Best Rock Album
Nick Didia (engineer/mixer), Brendan O'Brien (engineer/mixer & producer) & Bruce Springsteen for The Rising

Spoken
Best Spoken Word Album
Charles B. Potter (producer) & Maya Angelou for A Song Flung Up to Heaven
Best Spoken Word Comedy Album
Nathaniel Kunkel (engineer/mixer), Peter Asher (producer) & Robin Williams for Robin Williams - Live 2002

Traditional pop
Best Traditional Pop Vocal Album
Joel Moss, Tom Young (engineers/mixers), Phil Ramone (producer) & Tony Bennett for Playin' with My Friends: Bennett Sings the Blues

World
Best World Music Album
Oscar Marin (engineer/mixer), Walter Flores (engineer/mixer & producer) & Rubén Blades (producer & artist) for Mundo

In memoriam 

 Derek Bell)
 Bill Berry
 Otis Blackwell
 Hadda Brooks
 Ray Brown (musician)
 Rosemary Clooney
 Ray Conniff
 Tom Dowd
 Gus Dudgeon
 John Entwistle
 Erma Franklin
 Adolph Green
 Billy Guy
 Lionel Hampton
 Harlan Howard
 Jam Master Jay
 Peggy Lee
 Alan Lomax
 Lisa Lopes
 Arthur Lyman
 Peter Matz
 Jim McReynolds
 Mickey Newbury
 Dee Dee Ramone
 Mongo Santamaría
 Layne Staley
 Dave Van Ronk
 Timothy White
 Zal Yanovsky
 Joe Strummer

Special merit awards

Lifetime Achievement Award
Etta James
Johnny Mathis
Glenn Miller
Tito Puente
Simon & Garfunkel

Trustees Award
Alan Lomax
The New York Philharmonic

Legend Award
Bee Gees

Technical Grammy
Individual Contributions
Geoff Emerick
Company Contributions
Shure Incorporated

MusiCares Person of the Year
Bono

Grammy Hall of Fame Award
Aja (ABC, 1977) performed by Steely Dan
"Blowin' in the Wind" (Warner Bros., 1963) performed by Peter, Paul and Mary
Born to Run (Columbia, 1975) performed by Bruce Springsteen
"Both Sides, Now" (Elektra, 1968) performed by Judy Collins
"Days of Wine and Roses" (RCA, 1962) performed by Henry Mancini
"Downtown" (Warner Bros., 1964) performed by Petula Clark
Genius of Modern Music: Volume 1 (Blue Note, 1951) performed by Thelonious Monk
Genius of Modern Music: Volume 2 (Blue Note, 1952) performed by Thelonious Monk
Goodbye Yellow Brick Road (DJM, 1973) performed by Elton John
"Hotel California" (Asylum, 1977) performed by Eagles
"I Only Have Eyes for You" (End, 1959) performed by The Flamingos
"I Shot the Sheriff" (RSO, 1974) performed by Eric Clapton	
"It's Too Late" (Ode, 1971) performed by Carole King
"Lady Marmalade" (Epic, 1974) performed by Labelle worked from the album Nightbirds
"Proud Mary" (Liberty, 1970) performed by Ike & Tina Turner worked from the album Workin' Together.
Rumors (Warner Bros., 1977) performed by Fleetwood Mac
Shostakovich: Violin Concerto No. 1 in A Minor Op. 99 (Sony Classical, 1956) performed by David Oistrakh with New York Philharmonic conducted by Dimitri Mitropoulos
"Stairway to Heaven" (Atlantic, 1971) performed by Led Zeppelin
Still Crazy After All These Years (Columbia Records, 1975) performed by Paul Simon
"Stormy Weather" (Brunswick, 1933) performed by Ethel Waters
"Up, Up and Away" (Soul City, 1967) performed by The 5th Dimension

References

 045
2003 in American music
2003 in New York City
2003 music awards
Madison Square Garden
Grammy
February 2003 events in the United States